Mir Ali Sher Thattavi, Qaune (b.1728 - d.1788) was a Sindhi Muslim historian born after the rule of Mughal Emperor Aurangzeb. It has been said that he composed his first verses of poetry while still a boy, he studied the Fatawa-e-Alamgiri and later began to write essays independently. Thereafter began a career as a scholar, poet and historian. He went on to produce a great number of works under the pen-name Qani, on a variety of topics, including: the works of Al-Ghazali, Rumi. His most prominent work was the Gift of the Generous (Tuhfatul karaam) was his most famous work it dealt with a compendium of the lives of Sufis from the times of Muhammad until the late 12th/18th century, an account of the martyrs of Karbala, and a work of general history.

References

Historians from the Mughal Empire
People from Thatta District
Persian-language poets
Indian historians of Islam
1728 births
1788 deaths